Camden Underworld is a music venue in Camden Town, London, England. The venue is a part of the World's End pub, situated in the basement of the building. It has a capacity of 500 people.

History 
Over the years The Underworld has become the heart of the alternative music scene in England. Little is promoted about the history of the venue, although it dates back to the opening of the pub above it. The venue is owned by Glendola Leisure.

In 2007, during a press conference at The Underworld for his album Ziltoid the Omniscient, influential Canadian musician Devin Townsend chose to tell the press of his departure from touring and the breakup of his bands Strapping Young Lad and The Devin Townsend Band.

The Underworld also has a number of regular nights including a retro '80s night and Silver, a rock- and indie-themed event. Although the crowd tends to be young, some of the most popular events and music at the club include throwbacks, such as '80s and disco nights.

On 11 May 2009, The Underworld played host to the first Thrash and Burn European Tour 2009 after a change in venue (the show was originally meant to be at the Electric Ballroom, also located in Camden Town, London).

Since 2010, The Underworld has also played host to many international gigs, most notably to events by the Nepalese community in England. Famous Nepali bands such as Mukti, Revival, and Cobweb played here in gigs organised by GigExtra.

On 21 November 2010, The Underworld hosted the grand final of the national unsigned music competition Top of the Ox, which was won by singer-songwriter Ian Edwards.

Between 2008 and 2012, the venue hosted four editions of the British Steel Festival, featuring bands including Elixir, Witchfynde, Praying Mantis, Pagan Altar, Cloven Hoof, Jaguar, and Gunslinger.

Past featured bands 

Abingdon Boys School
AC4
Agalloch
Amon Amarth
Angel Witch
Anthrax
At the Drive-In
Avenged Sevenfold
Bad Religion
Biffy Clyro
Black Rebel Motorcycle Club
Black Veil Brides
Breathe Carolina
Bring Me the Horizon
The Blood
The Browning
TheCityIsOurs
Capture The Crown
Carach Angren
Carpathian Forest
Dropkick Murphys
English Dogs
Enter Shikari 
Exodus
Fall Out Boy
Fleshgod Apocalypse
Foo Fighters
Ghost
Jag Panzer
KT Tunstall
Kyle Gass Band (Kyle Gass of Tenacious D)
Leftöver Crack
Lubby Nugget
Memoriam
MGLA
Motionless In White
Parkway Drive
Placebo
Queens of the Stone Age
Radiohead
Reef
Sheryl Crow
Shonen Knife
Silent Descent
Silent Screams
Silverchair
Simple Plan
Skindred
Slash's Snakepit
Smashing Pumpkins
Sons of Alpha Centauri
Sorority Noise
Soundgarden
Spunge
Suede
The Darkness
The Datsuns
The Grandmothers (ex-Zappa)
The LoveCrave
The Offspring
twenty one pilots
Tyketto
UADA
Walking With Strangers (Band)
X Is Loaded
You Me At Six

See also
 Camden Underworld, London – 16 November 2001 - a 2002 video by As Friends Rust and Strike Anywhere
 Live at the Camden Underworld (2004) - DVD featuring Captain Everything!, Divit and Belvedere

Notes

External links

Music venues in London
Camden Town